Mbarak Kipkorir Hussein (born 4 April 1965) is a Kenyan athlete who specialises in long distance running, including the marathon. Having been a resident of Albuquerque since 1987, he obtained United States citizenship in 2004 and began representing the US internationally in 2007.

Career
A native of Kapsabet, near Eldoret, Kenya, he was a late comer to competitive running but he was inspired by the feats of his older brother, Ibrahim Hussein, who is a three-time Boston Marathon winner. Mbarak began his career as a middle distance runner, winning junior titles in track and cross country running, and also winning titles in the 800 and 1500 meters while at Lubbock Christian University. However, Hussein's greatest achievements came after the age of 30, when he began to focus on road running.

Following in the footsteps of his brother, he won the Honolulu Marathon, winning the 1998 race with a time of 2:14:53. He returned the following year but managed only third position, although a second-place finish at the Rock 'n' Roll San Diego Marathon saw him improve his best time by over four minutes. A sole third place in Honolulu was the highlight of 2000, but the following year he competed in the Boston Marathon for the first time, finishing fifth. In 2001, he won the Stride for Pride 5K, the Duke City 5K, the Long Beach Half-Marathon, and he closed the year with a second win at the Honolulu Marathon. Multiple victories also highlighted 2002: he finished in first place at America’s Finest City Half-Marathon, took the inaugural marathon title at the JoongAng Seoul Marathon, and won in Honolulu for a third time.

He finished fourth at the Seoul International Marathon and second in Honolulu in 2003, but he rebounded in 2004 by setting a personal best of 2:08:10 for third at the Dong-A Marathon and again taking third in South Korea with a fast time at the JoongAng Marathon. Following his successful application for US citizenship, he competed in his first American national marathon championships, held at the Twin Cities Marathon, and he won two years running in 2005 and 2006. He became eligible to compete internationally for his adopted country the year after and he took part in the 2007 World Championships in Athletics. In the world championship marathon final, he finished in 21st place with 2:23:04; his time was hampered by difficult weather conditions in Osaka but he was the United States' strongest performer in the race and headed the American team to fourth place in the Marathon World Cup. He now coaches Sandia High School Cross-Country and Track and Field in Albuquerque.

Achievements

Personal bests 

All information taken from IAAF profile.

References

External links

USATF profile for Mbarak Hussein
The Long Road from Kapsabet: Mbarak Hussein at 45, article from Running Times

1965 births
Living people
Kenyan male long-distance runners
American male long-distance runners
Kenyan male marathon runners
American male marathon runners
People from Nandi County
Track and field athletes from Albuquerque, New Mexico
20th-century Kenyan people
21st-century Kenyan people